Outcast Islands may refer to:

 Outcast Islands, in the Palmer Archipelago of Antarctica
 Outcast Islands (Nunavut), Canada

See also
Outcast of the Islands, a 1951 film 
An Outcast of the Islands, an 1896 novel by Joseph Conrad